John Iorweth Hughes (1913 - 1993) was a Welsh footballer who played professionally in England and Scotland. He played one game for the Wales national football team.

Playing career

Club career
Born in Rhosllanerchrugog, Hughes played for various Welsh clubs until 1932, when he joined Blackburn Rovers.  Over the next five years he made 47 appearances in the Football League First Division.  In 1937 he joined Mansfield Town, where he made 76 League appearances.  After the Second World War he played for a number of non-League teams in the Lancashire area before moving to Scotland to play for Third Lanark.

International career
Hughes gained one cap for the Welsh national team, on 27 March 1935 against Ireland.

See also
 List of Wales international footballers (alphabetical)

References

1913 births
1993 deaths
People from Rhosllanerchrugog
Sportspeople from Wrexham County Borough
Welsh footballers
Wales international footballers
Association football goalkeepers
Blackburn Rovers F.C. players
Mansfield Town F.C. players
Nelson F.C. players
Darwen F.C. players
Aberystwyth Town F.C. players
Bacup Borough F.C. players
Rossendale United F.C. players
Druids F.C. players